Atta ur Rehman Khan was an academic in the Bangladesh Liberation war and is considered a martyr in Bangladesh.

Early life
Khadim was born in Kharampur, Akhaura, Brahmanbaria District on 1933. He graduated from George H. E. School in 1948 and Dhaka College in 1950. He completed his master's degree in physics from Dhaka University in 1954.

Career
After graduation Khadim joined Philips Electric Company as an electrical engineer in 1955. From 1959 to 1960 he studied theoretical physics at the physics institute of University of Göttingen at Göttingen, West Germany. After completion he joined Dhaka University as a lecturer, where he specialized in experimental physics and electronics.

Death and legacy
On 25 March 1971, Khadim was killed by Pakistan army at the onset of Operation Searchlight and Bangladesh Liberation war, in the teachers' quarter of Shahidullah Hall in Dhaka University.

References

1933 births
1971 deaths
People killed in the Bangladesh Liberation War
Academic staff of the University of Dhaka
People from Brahmanbaria district
20th-century Bengalis